The Burke–Gilman Trail is a rail trail in King County, Washington. The  multi-use recreational trail is part of the King County Regional Trail System and occupies an abandoned Seattle, Lake Shore and Eastern Railway (SLS&E) corridor.

A portion of the Burke–Gilman trail is managed by the City of Seattle. The trail begins at 11th Avenue NW in Ballard and follows along the Lake Washington Ship Canal and north along Lake Washington, designated as ending in Bothell.

Route

The main trail resumes at 11th Avenue NW and NW 45th Street and runs  to Blyth Park in Bothell.

The Burke–Gilman trail runs along the Fremont Cut, Lake Union (an old freight depot remains visible at the foot of Stone Way), and through the University of Washington campus. After passing the University Village shopping center, the trail heads up through northeast neighborhoods, alongside the Hawthorne Hills, Laurelhurst and Windermere neighborhoods; through the Sand Point neighborhood, passing Magnuson Park, then alongside Lake Washington from just before the Matthews Beach and Cedar Park neighborhoods of the former Lake City, continuing on through Lake Forest Park and Kenmore to Bothell.  The trail throughout is nearly level with few large intersection crossings — it is a former railroad right-of-way.

The Seattle Parks Department considers the Burke–Gilman segment of the trail to end in Kenmore; while King County considers that the segments divide in Bothell,.

Sammamish River Trail
With the completion of a connector trail through Marymoor Park in May, 2009 the trail network continues to the city of Issaquah via the East Lake Sammamish Trail. The trail is over the Seattle, Lake Shore and Eastern Railway (SLS&E) line and in conjunction with Issaquah's Rainier Trail, Preston Trail, and the Preston Snoqualmie Trail.

The Snoqualmie Falls-North Bend link of SLS&E has become the line of the Northwest Railway Museum. The SLS&E terminated just beyond North Bend in Sallal Prairie. Users of the extensions can continue on the regional trail network at the Snoqualmie Valley Trail in North Bend and connect with the Iron Horse State Park at Rattlesnake Lake.

With the addition of the connector, the longest unbroken segment of the trail currently extends 42 miles.

Extensions
, there are extensions of the Burke–Gilman Trail at its western end: connecting the short and long segments between the Ballard Locks and 11th Avenue, and a northern extension along Shilshole Bay from NW 60th Street to Golden Gardens Park, and planning for connecting between the Ballard Locks and downtown Ballard at 11th Avenue NW and NW 45th Street.  A major point of contention regarding the remaining "missing link" project was the industrial nature of the Salmon Bay waterfront, through which this portion of the trail would pass.  Local business owners voiced concerns about the safety and liability issues inherent in the convergence of trains, trucks, cyclists, and pedestrians. A citizens groups, and the city, claimed the dangers were being exaggerated. The trail overall can at times be busy and even crowded.

History

The trail can trace its origins to the founding of the Seattle, Lake Shore and Eastern Railway on 15 April 1885, by ten men headed by judge Thomas Burke and Daniel Gilman. In its heyday, Burke and Gilman's road extended from Downtown Seattle north to Arlington and east to Rattlesnake Prairie above Snoqualmie Falls. Taken over by the Northern Pacific Railway around 1890, the line became part of the Burlington Northern Railroad in 1970, and was abandoned in 1971. In 1978, the first  of the right-of-way, from Seattle's Gas Works Park to Kenmore's Tracy Owen Station, was opened as a public trail and named after the founders of the railroad.

A two-mile section of the trail within Lake Forest Park was temporarily closed for redevelopment from June 2011 to February 2012.

Neighborhoods 
The trail intersects the following:  
 Seattle neighborhoods from western terminus east and north:
 Ballard
 Fremont
 Northlake (also known as south Wallingford)
 University District
 Trail runs alongside:
 University Village shopping center
 Hawthorne Hills, Laurelhurst and Windermere neighborhoods
 Sand Point neighborhood, passing Magnuson Park
 Lake City district of neighborhoods
 Matthews Beach
 Cedar Park 
 Suburban Seattle towns, continuing northeast, east and then south:
 Lake Forest Park
 Kenmore
 Bothell
 Woodinville
 Redmond

See also 
 Seattle, Lake Shore & Eastern Railway
 Ravenna-Cowen Park and Ravenna Creek
 Eastside Rail Corridor

References

Bibliography 

  
 
  Speidel provides a substantial bibliography with extensive primary sources.

Further reading 

 , HistoryLink Essay 7049.
 "Seattle's Bicycle Program: Bicycle Maps", Seattle Department of Transportation Bicycle Program. Also links to PDF format maps.
 "Seattle's Urban Trails System", Seattle Department of Transportation Bicycle Program. Map and description of citywide system, completed, funded, planned.
 Burke–Gilman Trail on a Google Map
 TrailLink.com - Burke Gilman Trail

Rail trails in Washington (state)
Parks in Bothell, Washington
Parks in Seattle
Transportation in Seattle